Erich Schmidt may refer to:

 Erich Schmidt (archaeologist) (1897–1964), German and American-naturalized archaeologist
 Erich Schmidt (historian) (1853–1913), German historian of literature 
 Erich Schmidt (pilot) (1914–1941), German Luftwaffe ace
 Erich Schmidt (soldier) (1911–1977), German officer
 Erich Schmidt (wrestler) (1925–2009), German Olympic wrestler
 Erich Schmidt (politician) (1831–1904), German-born American politician in Texas
  (1943–2019), Austrian politician and entrepreneur

See also 
 Eric Schmitt (disambiguation)
 Eric Schmidt (disambiguation)
 Erik Schmidt (disambiguation)
 Eric Smidt, American businessman